Barbara Everett (born 1932) is a Canadian-born British academic and literary critic, whose work has appeared frequently in the London Review of Books and The Independent. In addition to her own publications, she is recognised as a leading Shakespeare scholar.

Everett was born in Montreal, Canada. A graduate of St Hilda's College, Oxford, she is a retired Fellow of Somerville College. She was married to the late Oxford scholar of English literature, Emrys Jones, with whom she appeared in the 1996 documentary Looking for Richard.

Bibliography
Auden (1964)
Donne: A London Poet (1972), 
Poets in their Time: Essays on English Poetry from Donne to Larkin (1986), 
Young Hamlet: Essays on Shakespeare's Tragedies (1989),

References

Living people
Alumni of St Hilda's College, Oxford
Fellows of Somerville College, Oxford
Shakespearean scholars
British women academics
British literary critics
British women literary critics
British women non-fiction writers
1932 births